The women's tournament of the 2011 European Curling Championships took place in Moscow, Russia from December 2 to 10. The winners of the Group C tournament in Tarnby, Denmark will move on to the Group B tournament.
The top seven women's teams at the 2011 European Curling Championships, Scotland, Russia, Denmark, Germany, Italy, Switzerland, and the Czech Republic, will join defending champions Sweden in representing their respective nations at the 2012 Ford World Women's Curling Championship in Lethbridge, Alberta, Canada. The Czech Republic won the World Challenge Games over Group B winners Hungary to claim the last berth to the worlds.

In the Group A competitions, Sweden emerged from the round robin undefeated, with Denmark and Scotland trailing with one and two losses, respectively. Russia defeated Germany in the tiebreaker to qualify for the playoffs. The page playoffs saw defending champions Sweden trounce Denmark in eight ends and Scotland edge past Russia in an extra end. Scotland crushed Denmark in the semifinal in eight ends with a score of 10–2, and Denmark dropped to the bronze medal game. Home team Russia, skipped by Anna Sidorova, wrapped up a respectable performance with a 13–7 win over Denmark's Lene Nielsen. The final saw Sweden's Margaretha Sigfridsson, a lead at last year's championships, faced Scotland's Eve Muirhead in a rematch of the 2010 European Curling Championships gold medal game. An error-prone Sweden allowed Scotland to steal points in four of the first five ends before scoring a single point in the sixth. After two ends where both teams traded singles, bringing the game up to 6–2, Sweden conceded and gave Scotland their second championship title, their first since Betty Law led Scotland to win the inaugural championships in 1975.

The Group C competitions in Tårnby, Denmark saw Poland and Slovakia advance to the Group B competitions, after Slovakia defeated France in the semifinal. They joined eight other teams in Group B and played a round robin. In the page playoffs, Hungary advanced straight to the final after defeating Finland in the 1 vs. 2 game, while Poland advanced to the semifinal against Finland after defeating Slovakia. Finland won the semifinal over Poland, sending Poland to the bronze medal game to face Slovakia again. In their third meeting in the week, Slovakia finally triumphed over Poland by stealing the last two ends, winning with a score of 7–6. Hungary defeated Finland in a low-points affair to win the Group B competitions. As a result, Hungary and Finland advanced to the 2012 Women's Group A competitions, replacing Latvia and Norway, and Ireland and Wales were relegated to the 2012 Women's Group C competitions.

Group A

Teams

Round-robin standings
Final round-robin standings

Round-robin results

Draw 1
Saturday, December 3, 12:30

Draw 2
Saturday, December 3, 20:30

Draw 3
Sunday, December 4, 12:00

Draw 4
Sunday, December 4, 20:00

Draw 5
Monday, December 5, 12:00

Draw 6
Monday, December 5, 20:00

Draw 7
Tuesday, December 6, 16:00

Draw 8
Wednesday, December 7, 8:00

Draw 9
Wednesday, December 7, 16:00

Placement Games
Thursday, December 8, 14:00

Thursday, December 8, 20:30

 to World Challenge Games

World Challenge Games

Challenge 1
Friday, December 9, 20:00

Challenge 2
Saturday, December 10, 9:30

 moves on to the 2012 World Women's Championship.

Tiebreaker
Thursday, December 8, 14:00

Playoffs

Page 1 vs. 2
Thursday, December 8, 20:30

Page 3 vs. 4
Thursday, December 8, 20:30

Semifinal
Friday, December 9, 13:00

Bronze-medal game
Friday, December 9, 20:00

Gold-medal game
Saturday, December 10, 10:00

Group B

Teams

Round-robin standings
Final round-robin standings

Round-robin results

Draw 1
Saturday, December 3, 12:30

Draw 2
Saturday, December 3, 20:30

Draw 3
Sunday, December 4, 12:00

Draw 4
Sunday, December 4, 20:00

Draw 5
Monday, December 5, 12:00

Draw 6
Monday, December 5, 20:00

Draw 7
Tuesday, December 6, 12:00

Draw 8
Tuesday, December 6, 20:00

Draw 9
Wednesday, December 7, 12:00

Tiebreakers

Round 1
Wednesday, December 7, 20:00

Round 2
Thursday, December 8, 9:00

Playoffs

Page 1 vs. 2
Thursday, December 8, 20:00

Page 3 vs. 4
Thursday, December 8, 20:00

Semifinal
Friday, December 9, 8:00

Bronze-medal game
Saturday, December 10, 9:30

Gold-medal game
Friday, December 9, 13:00

Group C

Teams

Round-robin standings
Final round-robin standings

Yellow Group Results

Draw 1
Friday, September 30, 18:30

Draw 2
Saturday, October 1, 08:00

Draw 3
Sunday, October 2, 12:00

Draw 4
Monday, October 3, 12:00

Draw 5
Tuesday, October 4, 8:30

Green Group Results

Draw 1
Friday, September 30, 18:30

Saturday, October 1, 20:00

Draw 3
Sunday, October 2, 19:30

Draw 5
Monday, October 3, 19:30

Draw 7
Tuesday, October 4, 16:00

Playoffs

Page 1 vs. 2
Thursday, October 6, 12:00

Page 3 vs. 4
Thursday, October 6, 12:00

Semifinal
Thursday, October 6, 12:00

Gold-medal game
Thursday, October 6, 19:30

References

External links
Event Home Page
Results
ECC Group C tournament Home Page

European Curling Championships
2011 in women's curling
European Curling Championships
International curling competitions hosted by Russia
December 2011 sports events in Russia
2011 in Moscow
Sports competitions in Moscow
Women's curling competitions in Russia